Prosilio (literally "sunward place", before 1927: Δοβίσδανα - Dovisdana) is a village in the municipal unit of Tzoumerka (Ioannina, Epirus), Greece. It is situated on a mountainside of the Athamanika mountains, at 900 m elevation. It is 3 km southwest of Syrrako, 3 km west of Kalarites, 6 km north of Pramanta and 23 km southeast of Ioannina. Its population is 101 people (2011 census).

Prosilio is one of the Aromanian-speaking villages of Tzoumerka (including Syrrako, Kalarites, Matsouki, Palaiochori and Vathypedo).

Population

History

The community Dovisdana was created in 1919 (Law 184A - August 19), and was renamed Prosilio in 1928 (Law 81A - May 14).  The community became a part of the municipality of Tzoumerka and became a municipality district under Law 244A on December 4, 1997. Its inhabitants were not of Aromanian origin, but since they traded mainly with Aromanians, they understood and spoke the Aromanian language.

See also

List of settlements in the Ioannina regional unit

References

External links
Prosilio at the GTP Travel Pages

Populated places in Ioannina (regional unit)